Ameth Fall (born 4 April 1991) is a Senegalese professional footballer who plays as a forward for Italian club Tivoli Calcio 1919

Club career

Cesena
Born in Dakar, the capital of Senegal, Fall started his European career in Italy for A.C. Cesena. He was the member of the Primavera (under-20) reserve squad during the 2009–10 Campionato Nazionale Primavera. In the summer of 2010, Fall was sent on loan to the Lega Pro Seconda Divisione, with Bellaria, where he went on to score 3 goals in 14 league matches during the andata of the 2010-11 Lega Pro Seconda Divisione season. In January 2011, he returned to Cesena, and was loaned to Calcio Lecco, as part of the negotiation that saw Samuele Buda move the opposite direction. Lecco also obtained the option to purchase the player outright at the conclusion of the season. After 3 goals in 8 league appearances for the club during the second half of the 2010-11 campaign, Lecco opted to purchase Fall outright in July 2011.

Lecco
After officially signing outright for Lecco in July 2011, Fall initially failed to break into the team's starting lineup, though he regularly appeared as a substitute. His first start for the club came on 9 October 2011 in a 2–2 home draw with Poggibonsi. He scored his first goal for the club 6 November 2011 in a 2–1 home win against Santarcangelo. He concluded the 2011-12 Lega Pro Seconda Divisione with 4 goals in 32 league appearances (15 starts), though Lecco was relegated from the professional league in June 2012 due to financial irregularities and thus, Fall was automatically released.

Calcio Catania
On 31 August 2012 Fall was acquired by Serie A club Calcio Catania on a free transfer. He was co-currently loaned out to former club Bellaria on the same day. Upon his return to his former club, Fall debuted on 23 September 2012 in a 1–1 home draw against Fano. His first goals of the 2012-13 season came on 21 October 2012, when he bagged a brace against S.S. Milazzo in a 3–1 home victory. Fall also scored two additional braces in a 2–1 victory over A.C. Renate on 11 November 2012 and a week later on 18 November 2012 in a 4–4 away draw versus Venezia. After beginning the season brightly, Fall went on an 8-match scoring drought between November and February, before succumbing to a season-ending injury after just 11 minutes during a 2–2 draw with Monza on 3 February 2013 . He returned to action in the final match of the season prior to the expiration of his loan deal on 30 June 2013.

On 6 August 2013, Catania officially announced the temporary transfer of the attacker to A.C. Rimini 1912 in the Lega Pro Seconda Divisione on a season-long loan deal. Fall was simultaneously joined by teammate Francesco Nicastro, who transferred to the fourth division side on a permanent deal.

References

External links
 Football.it Profile 
 
 

1991 births
Living people
Senegalese footballers
Footballers from Dakar
Association football forwards
A.C. Cesena players
A.C. Bellaria Igea Marina players
Calcio Lecco 1912 players
Catania S.S.D. players
Rimini F.C. 1912 players
A.S.D. Barletta 1922 players
S.S. Ischia Isolaverde players
S.S. Fidelis Andria 1928 players
Como 1907 players
S.C. Caronnese S.S.D. players
S.S.D. Sanremese Calcio players
A.S.D. Città di Varese players
A.S.D. Cjarlins Muzane players
A.S.D. Atletico Terme Fiuggi players
Serie C players
Serie D players
Senegalese expatriate footballers
Senegalese expatriate sportspeople in Italy
Expatriate footballers in Italy